The Fawn River is a river in the north of the Unorganized Part of Kenora District in Northwestern Ontario, Canada. It is in the Hudson Bay drainage basin and is a right tributary of the Severn River. The Severn/Fawn basin is one of the last few remaining undammed and unregulated watersheds south of the 55th parallel in North America.

Geography
The river begins at an unnamed lake and flows northeast through Fawn Lake to Big Trout Lake, the location of the Kitchenuhmaykoosib Inninuwug First Nation (also called the Big Trout Lake First Nation). The river exits the lake at the east and flows north to Angling Lake, the location of the Wapekeka First Nation. The river heads northeast over Ashaway Falls and Crandall Falls, and takes in the right tributaries Little Otter River, Otter River and Fat River. It turns north, takes in the right tributary Pitticow River, then heads northwest. It receives the left tributaries Burning River and Poplar River, and reaches its mouth at the Severn River, which flows to Hudson Bay.

Tributaries
Poplar River (left)
Burning River (left)
Pitticow River (right)
Sugar Creek (right)
Mink Creek (right)
Stout Creek (right)
Fat River (right)
Otter River (right)
Little Otter River (right)

Fawn River Provincial Park 

The first section runs from its source to Big Trout Lake, and includes Fawn Lake. The second section runs downstream from Angling Lake at Wapekeka Reserve No. 2. It was established in May 1989.

The park is notable for its position on the transition zone between the boreal and sub-arctic forest.

It is a non-operating park without any facilities or services. The park can be used for recreational activities such as fishing, hunting, canoeing, camping and snowmobiling.

Transportation
The river can be accessed by air from Big Trout Lake Airport and Angling Lake/Wapekeka Airport.

See also
List of rivers of Ontario

References

Sources

Rivers of Kenora District